Richard Donald Lewis (born 1930) is an English communication consultant, writer, polyglot and social theorist. He is chiefly known for his "Lewis Model of Cross-Cultural Communication."

Early life

Richard Donald Lewis was born in Billinge, Lancashire on 13 July 1930.  He is descended from a long line of coal miners, originally from Mold, North Wales. 

After completing his schooling in Lancashire, Lewis went on to study Modern Languages at the University of Nottingham and also gained a diploma in Cultures and Civilisations from the Sorbonne in Paris.
After attending the 1952 Olympic Games in Helsinki, Lewis spent the next two years living and working in Finland, where he learnt to speak Finnish and also came to know and love the Finnish people and culture.

Career

He founded the Berlitz School of Languages in Finland in 1955, and later opened a further 5 schools in Finland.  In addition, he opened Berlitz schools in Norway in 1958 and in Portugal in 1959. 

In 1966, Lewis founded the Berlitz School in Tokyo and spent the next 5 years living and working in Japan, where he became tutor to Empress Michiko.

He claims to speak 11 languages: English, French, Spanish, Italian, Portuguese, German, Swedish, Danish, Norwegian, Finnish and Japanese. 

He is currently Chairman of Richard Lewis Communications Ltd.

The Lewis Model 

The Lewis Model of Cross-Cultural Communication was developed by Richard D. Lewis.  The core of the model classifies cultural norms into Linear-Active, Multi-Active and Re-Active, or some combination.  Broadly speaking, Northern Europe, North America and related countries are predominantly Linear-Active, following tasks sequentially using Platonic, Cartesian logic.  Southern European, Latin, African and Middle-Eastern countries are typified as Multi-Active, centred on relationships and often pursuing multiple goals simultaneously.  East Asia is typically Re-Active, following harmonising, solidarity-based strategies. 

While Lewis' writings recognise these can only be stereotypes, he asserts that his model provides a practical framework for understanding and communicating with people of other cultures, and that the model can readily be expanded with other features, such as Hofstede's cultural dimensions, seen in relation to Lewis' triangular representation.

Honours

Lewis was knighted by President Ahtisaari of Finland in March 1997 in recognition of his services in the cross-cultural field relating to the training of Finnish Ministries for EU entry (1995) and the EU Presidency (1999). 

He was subsequently promoted to the rank of Knight Commander by President Halonen in 2009.  He has always  promoted the greatness of the Finnish culture in his publications, which efforts have been highly appreciated by the Finnish government and various public and private organisations.

Media

In 2015 Lewis won the prestigious SIETAR Founders Award. This award, with its citation "Making a World of Difference", is granted to an individual who has demonstrated outstanding commitment and service to the intercultural field.

Fish Can't See Water by Richard D. Lewis and Kai Hammerich won the Management Book of the Year award in Denmark in 2013. The book has been cited since then in many highly acknowledged business magazines, newspapers and blogs for its practical approach and tips on how national cultures impact corporate strategies and their execution.

Lewis publishes regularly articles in the worldwide read business magazine, the Business Insider. His articles focus mainly on tips and background information for doing successful business with different cultures of the world.

In 2016 Richard Lewis Communications plc was "named and shamed" for failing to pay several employees the National Minimum Wage.

However, this relates to a situation dating to 2013, when a change in the system of deductions for accommodation and meals meant that the company inadvertently and temporarily paid less than the National Minimum Wage to some members of its domestic staff. As soon as this was clarified, arrears were paid in full to the staff concerned, and the system was changed to comply with National Minimum Wage legislation. This action was acknowledged in a case closure letter from HMRC in which the Compliance Officer said he was 'satisfied' that all arrears had been paid and that the correct rate was now being paid.

Publications

"Fish Can't See Water: How National Culture Can Make or Break Your Corporate Strategy" (2013), published by John Wiley & Sons
“When Teams Collide: Managing the International Team Successfully” (2012), published by Nicholas Brealey International
“When Cultures Collide: Leading across Cultures” (2018, 2006, 1999, 1996), published by Nicholas Brealey International
“Cross Cultural Communication: A Visual Approach” (2008, 1999), published by Transcreen Publications
“The Cultural Imperative: Global Trends in the 21st Century” (2007, 2003), published by Intercultural Press
“Humour across Frontiers” (2005), published by Transcreen Publications
“Finland, Cultural Lone Wolf” (2005), published by Intercultural Press
“The Billingers” (2009, 1985, 1976), published by Transcreen Publications
“The Road from Wigan Pier: Memoirs of a Linguist” (1998, autobiography), published by Transcreen Publications

References

External links
Richard Lewis Communications
The Lewis Model Explains Every Culture In The World

1930 births
Living people
English male writers
Linguists from the United Kingdom
People from Higher End
University of Paris alumni